1,1-Bis(diphenylphosphino)methane (dppm), is an organophosphorus compound with the formula CH2(PPh2)2. Dppm, a white, crystalline powder, is used in inorganic and organometallic chemistry as a ligand. It is more specifically a chelating ligand because it is a ligand that can bond to metals with two phosphorus donor atoms.  The natural bite angle is 73°.

Synthesis and reactivity
1,1-Bis(diphenylphosphino)methane was first prepared by the reaction of sodium diphenylphosphide (Ph2PNa) with dichloromethane:
Ph3P + 2 Na → Ph2PNa + NaPh
2NaPPh2 + CH2Cl2 → Ph2PCH2PPh2 + 2 NaCl

The methylene group (CH2) in dppm (and especially its complexes) is mildly acidic. The ligand can be oxidized to give the corresponding oxides and sulfides CH2[P(E)Ph2]2 (E = O, S). The methylene group is even more acidic in these derivatives.

Coordination chemistry
As a chelating ligand, 1,1-bis(diphenylphosphino)methane forms a four-membered ring with the constituents MP2C. The ligand promotes the formation of bimetallic complexes that feature five-membered M2P2C rings. In this way, dppm promotes the formation of bimetallic complexes. One such example is the dipalladium chloride, Pd2Cl2(dppm)2.  In this complex, the oxidation state for the Pd centres are I. Bis(diphenylphosphino)methane gives rise to a family of coordination compounds known as A-frame complexes.

References

Diphosphines
Phenyl compounds